Alesson dos Santos Batista (born 16 February 1999), simply known as Alesson, is a Brazilian footballer who plays as either an attacking midfielder or a forward for Vila Nova.

Club career
Born in Guarulhos, São Paulo, Alesson started his career with PSTC in 2013, at the age of 14. He moved to Paraná in 2015, and made his first team debut for the latter club on 19 November 2016 by starting in a 1–1 Série B away draw against Ceará.

Alesson started the 2017 season on loan at Ponte Preta's under-20, before moving to Cruzeiro in September, also in a temporary deal. He returned to Paraná in September 2018, after Cruzeiro did not exercise his buyout clause; upon returning, he was assigned to the first team now in the Série A.

Alesson made his top tier debut on 27 October 2018, replacing Jhonny Lucas in a 1–3 away loss against former side Cruzeiro. He scored his first senior goal the following 7 February, netting the opener in a 5–2 away win against Itabaiana, for the year's Copa do Brasil.

On 6 January 2020, Alesson moved to Bahia on a two-year contract, after reaching an agreement to terminate his contract with Paraná.

Career statistics

Honours
Bahia
Campeonato Baiano: 2020

References

External links
Bahia profile 

1999 births
Living people
People from Guarulhos
Brazilian footballers
Association football midfielders
Association football forwards
Campeonato Brasileiro Série A players
Campeonato Brasileiro Série B players
Paraná Clube players
Esporte Clube Bahia players
Vila Nova Futebol Clube players
Footballers from São Paulo (state)